The 2020 Fermanagh Senior Football Championship was the 114th edition of the Fermanagh GAA's premier club Gaelic football tournament for senior clubs in County Fermanagh, Northern Ireland. The tournament consists of eight teams. The championship had a straight knock-out format (the format was not changed in spite of the COVID-19 pandemic). The draw for the championship was made on 29 June 2020.

Derrygonnelly Harps were the defending champions, seeking their sixth title in a row. They were denied in the final by Ederney St Joseph's, who won their second title and their first since 1968.

Team changes
The following teams have changed division since the 2019 championship season.

To Championship
Promoted from 2019 Intermediate Championship
 Kinawley Brian Borus - (Intermediate Champions)

From Championship
Relegated to 2020 Intermediate Championship
 Devenish St Mary's - (Relegation Play-off Losers)

Bracket

Quarter-finals

Semi-finals

Final

Relegation playoffs
The four losers of the quarter-finals playoff in this round. The two losers will playoff in the relegation final, the loser of which will be relegated to the 2021 Intermediate Football Championship.

Relegation semi-finals

Relegation final

References

Fermanagh Senior Football Championship
Fermanagh SFC
Fermanagh Senior Football Championship